Select Essays of Sister Nivedita (1911) is an English-language book written by Sister Nivedita, a disciple of Swami Vivekananda. The foreword of the book was written by A. J. F. Blair.

Theme 
In this book Nivedita has written essays dealing with India, Indian culture, religion, society, history, politics, etc. She also presented her views on the condition of Indian women of that time, Swadesi movement etc. After discussing different problems that India and Hinduism faced at that time Nivedita gave her own ideas to revive and reform as well. The appendix section of book contains some tributes to Sister Nivedita.

References

External links 
 Full book at Archive.org

1911 non-fiction books
English-language books
Books by Sister Nivedita
20th-century Indian books
Essay collections